The following is a list of television series produced in Iceland:

External links
 Icelandic TV at the Internet Movie Database

 
Lists of television series by country of production
Television